Patul  is a village in Chanditala I community development block of Srirampore subdivision in Hooghly district in the Indian state of West Bengal.

Geography
Patul is located at:

Gram panchayat
Villages in Shiakhala gram panchayat are: Chak Tajpur, Madhupur, Paschim Tajpur, Patul, Raghunathpur, Sandhipur and Sehakhala.

Demographics
As per 2011 Census of India Patul had a total population of 4,083 of which 2,019 (49%) were males and 2,064 (51%) were females. Population below 6 years was 385. The total number of literates in Patul was 3,350 (90.59% of the population over 6 years).

References 

Villages in Chanditala I CD Block